Elena Carrión de la Lastra (born August 3, 1970) is a former field hockey goalkeeper from Spain, who represented her native country at two consecutive Olympic Games: in 1996 and 2000. At her last try, she finished fourth with the Spanish national team, after a 2–0 loss in the bronze medal game against the Netherlands. In 1996, in Atlanta, the goalie of Sardinero Caja Cantabria finished in 8th position.

References

External links
 

1970 births
Living people
Spanish female field hockey players
Female field hockey goalkeepers
Olympic field hockey players of Spain
Field hockey players at the 1996 Summer Olympics
Field hockey players at the 2000 Summer Olympics
Field hockey players from Cantabria
Sportspeople from Santander, Spain